Lüchow (Wendland) is a city in northeastern Lower Saxony, in Germany. It is the seat of the Samtgemeinde ("collective municipality") Lüchow (Wendland), and is the capital of the district Lüchow-Dannenberg. Situated approximately 13 km north of Salzwedel, Lüchow is located on the German Framework Road. In the Polabian language, Lüchow is called Ljauchüw (Lgauchi or Lieuschü in older German reference material).

In Lüchow one can find the Stones Fan Museum. The museum is designated to the Rolling Stones and was founded in 2011.

Geography
The river Jeetzel, a tributary of the Elbe, flows through the city. The surrounding landscape was created by glacial action, rising in the west, lower in the east.

A total of 89 km2 are within the limits of the city, which is divided into 24 boroughs: 

Several of the boroughs are named for, and generally represent, previously-independent settlements which Lüchow has incorporated. 

The site was first mentioned in 1158, and received city rights in 1293. The only remnant of the fortifications built to defend in the late Middle Ages is a tower, which was adapted and used as a bell tower by St John's Church. A gate was erected in 1555 which divided the city centre from its western suburbs; this gate was demolished in 1793. Lüchow suffered from an outbreak of the Plague in 1537, and barely half a century later, in 1589, was largely destroyed by fire. Another fire in 1608 destroyed much of what had been rebuilt. The worst fire, in 1811, destroyed even the city hall and the Schloss.

Twin towns - sister cities
Lüchow is twinned with:

 Céret, France (1983)
 Oborniki, Poland (2007)
 Steglitz-Zehlendorf (Berlin), Germany (2019)

Sons and daughters of the city
Friedrich Syrup was born in Lüchow.
Detlef Weigel grew up and attended high school in Lüchow.

External links

Official Webpage
Facebook Page

References
Johann Parum Schultze; Reinhold Olesch (publisher): Fontes linguae Dravaenopolabicae minores et Chronica Venedica J. P. Schultzii. (= Slavistische Forschungen; Band 7). Böhlau, Köln und Graz 1967
Christian Hennig von Jessen: Vocabularium Venedicum (oder Wendisches Wörter-Buch) (1705). Nachdruck besorgt von Reinhold Olesch. - Köln [u.a.]: Böhlau 1959 (Pastor C. Hennig von Jessen's source was the Polabian-speaking Johann Janieschge of Klennow)
Some of the content of this article comes from the equivalent German-language Wikipedia article. Retrieved on 26 November 2010. The following references are cited by that German-language article:
 Chronik der Stadt Lüchow. Druck- und Verlagsgesellschaft E. Köhring, Lüchow 1949, 2. unveränd. Nachdruck (second unaltered edition) 1989
 Karl Kowalewski: Lüchow. Vom Mittelalter bis zur Gegenwart. Beiträge zur Geschichte der Jeetzel-Stadt. Stade 1980
 Karl Kowalewski: Der große Brand von Lüchow 1811 und der Wiederaufbau der Stadt, Lüchow 2006
 Karl Kowalewski: Von Altertümern und von Heimatliebe. Notizen und Beobachtungen aus Anlaß des Doppeljubiläums; 75 Jahre Wendländischer Altertumsverein 1905–1980; 50 Jahre Wendländisches Heimatmuseum 1930–1980. Lüchow 1980
 Burghard Kulow: Lüchow (Wendland), Die 50er und 60er Jahre. Horb 2006
 Hans Nordsiek: Von Lüchow nach Salzwedel – auf den Spuren des Mindener Reformators Nicolaus Krage. In: Mitteilungen des Mindener Geschichtsvereins, 53/1981, pages 51–106
 Peter und Torsten Schoepe: Lüchow. Wandel des Stadtbildes in 120 Jahren. Lüchow 1985

Wendland
Lüchow-Dannenberg